Selvarajoo S/O Malayappan Krishnasamy (born December 15, 1952 in Singapore), better known as Rocky Selvarajoo, is a former boxer from Singapore, who won the silver medal in the 1976 Asean Boxing Championships.

Rocky fought world champion and Montreal Olympic gold medalist Gu Yong-ju in 1977, but the fight had to be stopped after he received a cut to his eye. In the 1978 Bangkok King's Cup, he beat 1979 Sea Games gold medalist Johnny Elorde by technical knockout.

In 1982, he won the Golden Gloves Championship.

In 1985, Rocky took part in the 1985 Southeast Asian Games in the light middleweight category.

In 1991, at 38, he knocked out 1985 Sea Games silver medalist Thaweewat Islam, who was then 23, in the first round of a demonstration.

He retired as an undefeated national champion in six weight categories in 1991.

References

External links
 1976 Asean Boxing Championships

1952 births
Living people
Singaporean male boxers
Featherweight boxers
Southeast Asian Games medalists in boxing
Singaporean people of Tamil descent
Singaporean sportspeople of Indian descent